Vitaliy Shkurlatov (born 25 May 1979, in Volgograd) is a Russian long jumper. His personal best is 8.23 metres, achieved in August 2003 in Tula.

International competitions

National titles
Russian Athletics Championships
Long jump: 2003, 2004, 2005, 2009

References

1979 births
Living people
Russian male long jumpers
Olympic male long jumpers
Olympic athletes of Russia
Athletes (track and field) at the 2004 Summer Olympics
World Athletics Championships athletes for Russia
Russian Athletics Championships winners
Sportspeople from Volgograd